The East Tamar Highway is a highway in Tasmania, Australia.  It covers the eastern edge of the Tamar River, from Launceston to the lighthouse at Low Head.

It is labelled as route A8, but prior to 1980 was signed as State Route 1.

Plans for a high-speed East Tamar Highway date back to the 1950s.

Major intersections
Four shielded routes terminate at the intersections of streets in the Launceston CBD. Because all the involved streets are one-way each route has separate inbound and outbound termini. One of these routes is the East Tamar Highway. Distances from each terminus to a point on the route may not be identical. Those shown below are from the outbound terminus.

See also
 
 
 Highways in Australia
 List of highways in Tasmania

References

External links
Tasmania's Highways on OZROADS

Highways in Tasmania